Slana is a village administratively located in the Town of Petrinja in Sisak-Moslavina County, Croatia.

References

Populated places in Sisak-Moslavina County